The following is a list of Saturn Award winners for Best Actor on Television (formerly Best Genre TV Actor).

The award is presented annually by the Academy of Science Fiction, Fantasy and Horror Films, honoring the work of actors in science fiction, fantasy, and horror fiction on television. 

As of the 47th Saturn Awards in 2022, the award is known as Best Actor in a Network or Cable Television Series and features a sister category: Saturn Award for Best Actor in a Streaming Television Series.

(NOTE: Year refers to year of eligibility, the actual ceremonies are held the following year.)

The winners are listed in bold.

Winners and nominees

1990s

2000s

2010s

2020s

Multiple nominations
8 nominations
 Richard Dean Anderson
 Michael C. Hall
7 nominations
 Andrew Lincoln
6 nominations
 Ben Browder
 Bryan Cranston
 Matthew Fox
 Sam Heughan
 Noah Wyle
5 nominations
 David Boreanaz
 Grant Gustin
 Tom Welling
4 nominations
 David Duchovny
 Timothy Hutton
3 nominations
 Scott Bakula
 Bruce Campbell
 Mads Mikkelsen
 Edward James Olmos
2 nominations
 Kevin Bacon
 Jason Behr
 Nicholas Brendon
 Eric Close
 Mike Colter
 Charlie Cox
 Matt Dallas
 Hugh Dancy
 Lance Henriksen
 Freddie Highmore
 Seth MacFarlane
 Julian McMahon
 Stephen Moyer
 Bob Odenkirk
 Patrick Stewart

Multiple wins
3 awards
 David Boreanaz (2 consecutive)

2 awards
 Ben Browder
 Bryan Cranston (consecutive)
 Matthew Fox
 Andrew Lincoln

See also
 Saturn Award for Best Actor in Streaming Presentation

External links
 Official Site
 23rd, 24th, 25th, 26th, 27th, 28th, 29th, 30th, 31st, 32nd, 33rd, 34th, 35th, 36th, 37th, 38th, 39th, 40th, 41st, 40th, 42nd

Actor on Television

ja:サターン主演男優賞#テレビ